Varikuntapadu or Variguntapadu is a village and a Mandal in Nellore district in the state of Andhra Pradesh in India. 
Varikuntapadu is a small town on the state road from Pamuru to Nellore .

Geography
It has an average elevation of 112 meters (370 feet).

References 

Villages in Nellore district